Kenneth Alfred Barfield (July 19, 1929 – September 24, 2000) was an American football offensive and defensive tackle in the National Football League for the Washington Redskins.  He played college football at the University of Mississippi and was drafted in the 23rd round of the 1952 NFL Draft.  He is among 226 NFL players recognized for serving during the Korean War.

References

1929 births
2000 deaths
American football defensive tackles
American football offensive tackles
Ole Miss Rebels football players
Washington Redskins players
Players of American football from Georgia (U.S. state)
People from Ware County, Georgia